Río Matilde is a short river in the municipality of Ponce, Puerto Rico.  It forms from the confluence of Rio Pastillo and Rio Canas. Río Matilde is one of the 14 rivers in the municipality and, forming at an altitude of just , it forms at an altitude lower than any other river in the municipality.

Origin
The name Río Matilde has sometimes been used to refer to a segment of Río Pastillo, but Río Matilde actually results from the confluence of Río Pastillo and Río Canas. Río Pastillo joins from its easterly run in the western section of the municipality of Ponce, while Río Canas joins from its southerly run in the northwestern area of the municipality of Ponce, both merging to form Río Matilde at their confluence in Barrio Canas just west of Urbanizacion Rio Canas and north of PR-2 in Ponce.

Features
The river is approximately one mile long and empties into the Caribbean Sea at 17°58'55"N, 66°38'16"W in the area of Los Meros in Barrio Playa.

Canalization
The Government of Puerto Rico has plans to canalize this river.

Course
The following table summarizes the course of Rio Matilde in terms of roads crossed. Roads are listed as the river flows from its origin in the confluence of Rio Pastillo and Rio Canas, located in Barrio Canas, east of the city of Ponce, to its emptying into the Caribbean Sea in Barrio Playa in the south (N/A = Data not available):

See also
 List of rivers of Puerto Rico
 List of rivers of Ponce

Notes

References

External links
 USGS Hydrologic Unit Map – Caribbean Region (1974)

Rivers of Puerto Rico
Rivers of Ponce, Puerto Rico